Jayton is a city in and the county seat of Kent County, Texas, United States. It is located in the northeastern portion of the county, and the population was 534 as of the 2010 census.

History
Jayton's history begins in the 1880s. A post office was granted in 1886, and Daniel Jay served as the community's first postmaster. In 1907, the townsite was moved to its present location for improved proximity to rail service, and it was officially renamed "Jayton" later that same year. The community's first newspaper, the Jayton Herald, was established the following year, and the city incorporated in February 1910. By 1925, Jayton was home to 750 residents.

From the community's inception, the local economy had originally been supported mainly by the cotton industry, but the Dust Bowl of the 1930s had a dire effect on production. The community's economy was stabilized by the discovery of oil later that same decade, and while its population never exceeded 750, Jayton remained stable throughout the Great Depression. In 1954, following a lengthy and heated court battle, the city wrested the title of county seat from the declining nearby community of Clairemont, and in 1957, a courthouse was constructed. Jayton's population remained around 600 from the 1950s through the 1980 census before declining to 513 in 1990 and 441 in 2000, but a resurgence in the local oil industry led to a rebound, and the 2010 census counted 534 residents.

Geography

Jayton is located in eastern Kent County at  (33.2493, –100.5748). U.S. Route 380 touches the southern border of the city; the highway leads southeast  to Aspermont and southwest  to Clairemont. Texas State Highway 70 is Jayton's Main Street and leads northwest  to Spur. The closest large cities are Lubbock,  to the northwest, and Abilene,  to the southeast.

Kent County Airport is south of the city. The airport has one asphalt runway  in length. The nearest airport with commercial service is roughly 100 miles away in Lubbock.

Demographics

2020 census
Note: the US Census treats Hispanic/Latino as an ethnic category. This table excludes Latinos from the racial categories and assigns them to a separate category. Hispanics/Latinos can be of any race. 

As of the 2020 United States census, there were 511 people, 207 households, and 108 families residing in the city.

2000 census
As of the census of 2000,  513 people, 209 households, and 144 families resided in the city. The population density was 301.6 people per square mile (116.5/km). The 277 housing units averaged 162.9/sq mi (62.9/km). The racial makeup of the city was 96.69% White, 0.19% African American, 0.39% Native American, 2.53% from other races, and 0.19% from two or more races. Hispanics or Latinos of any race were 10.92% of the population.

Of the  209 households, 25.8% had children under the age of 18 living with them, 59.3% were married couples living together, 6.2% had a female householder with no husband present, and 31.1% were not families. About 29.2% of all households were made up of individuals, and 15.8% had someone living alone who was 65 years of age or older. The average household size was 2.27 and the average family size was 2.81.

In the city, the population was distributed as 19.7% under the age of 18, 4.9% from 18 to 24, 20.7% from 25 to 44, 27.9% from 45 to 64, and 26.9% who were 65 years of age or older. The median age was 50 years. For every 100 females, there were 84.5 males. For every 100 females age 18 and over, there were 83.1 males.

The median income for a household in the city was $32,396, and for a family was $39,375. Males had a median income of $25,000 versus $21,875 for females. The per capita income for the city was $17,314. About 9.6% of families and 8.8% of the population were below the poverty line, including 5.5% of those under age 18 and 1.0% of those age 65 or over.

Education
The city is served by the Jayton-Girard Independent School District, and the local high school is Jayton High School.

Climate
According to the Köppen climate classification system, Jayton has a semiarid climate, BSk on climate maps.

In popular culture
Jayton is briefly mentioned in the 2016 film Hell or High Water.

Notable people
 

Jim W. Corder (1929–1998), a scholar of rhetoric.

References

Cities in Texas
Cities in Kent County, Texas
County seats in Texas
1880s establishments in Texas